Francisco Ramón de Vicuña Larraín (September 9, 1775 – January 13, 1849) was a Chilean political figure. He served twice as acting President of Chile in 1829. Francisco Vicuña was of Basque descent.

Early life
He was born in Santiago on 1775, the son of Francisco de Vicuña Hidalgo y Zavala and of María del Carmen Larraín Salas y Vicuña. He married Mariana de Aguirre, and had 11 children with her.

In 1810, Vicuña participated in Chile's war for independence and organized the first firearms production in the country. In 1811, he represented Osorno in the congress, which was to give Chile a constitution, in 1814, he moved to the Senate of Chile. Then, he was arrested for conspiracy against the Spanish crown and banished into exile. Only after Chile's victory at the battle of Chacabuco in 1817, was he able to return to his home land. Bernardo O'Higgins appointed him as a government representative to the northern provinces.

Political life
In 1823 he became the head of the administration of Santiago and then as a delegate to the constitutional convention that year. He was one of the main defenders of the Federalist position championed by José Miguel Infante y Rojas. In 1825 the Supreme Director of Chile Ramón Freire appointed him to be his deputy as well as foreign and interior minister and at times acting war, naval, and finance minister.

In 1829, when Francisco Antonio Pinto was elected President of Chile, the runners-up were Francisco Ruiz-Tagle Portales, a liberal federalist, and José Joaquín Prieto Vial, a conservative centralist, who both received the same number of votes. Nonetheless, congress, the majority of which was liberal, declared Joaquín Vicuña Larraín, a distant third and brother of Francisco Ramón (who was president of the senate) Vice President of Chile. The centralists outraged decided for armed resistance and the Chilean Civil War of 1829 broke out.

In the ensuing civil war between the conservative centralists and the liberal federalists, Pinto was forced twice to leave the post of president to Vicuña. First, from July 14 to October 19, when Vicuña assumed as President Delegate, and then finally when he resigned on November 2 and Vicuña assumed power. On December 7, 1829 the conservative troops under José Joaquín Prieto Vial approached Santiago from the South. The government under Vicuña fled northward to Coquimbo, where they were, however, imprisoned by the victorious conservative troops. Then, Chile was without a leader for a few weeks (from December 7 to 24, 1829) until a Government Junta was organized and took control under José Tomás Ovalle.

Under the centralist governments of José Joaquín Prieto Vial and Manuel Bulnes, the liberal Vicuña could not hold any governmental positions. He died in Santiago on January 13, 1849.

Cabinet

See also
Vicuña family
Chilean Civil War of 1829
Chilean Civil War of 1829–1830

Sources

1775 births
1849 deaths
People from Santiago
Presidents of Chile
Chilean Ministers of the Interior
Foreign ministers of Chile
Chilean Ministers of Defense
Chilean people of Basque descent
People of the Chilean Civil War of 1829–30
Liberal Party (Chile, 1849) politicians
Presidents of the Senate of Chile
Vicuña
Francisco